Kazakoshi Park Arena is an indoor arena located in Karuizawa, Nagano, Japan. Constructed in 1990 with an opening ceremony taking place in 1996, it hosted the curling competition for the 1998 Winter Olympics in Nagano. Because it was in Karuizawa, the town became the first venue to host events at both the Summer and Winter Olympics. At the 1964 Summer Olympics in Tokyo, Karuizawa hosted the equestrian events.

References
1998 Winter Olympics official report. Volume 2. pp. 233–5.
Icing.org profile of the venue.
Shinmai.co.jp 1998 Winter Olympics profile of the arena.

Venues of the 1998 Winter Olympics
Olympic curling venues
Indoor arenas in Japan
Curling venues in Japan
Sports venues in Nagano Prefecture